Kiss Kiss Bang Bang is a 2005 American neo-noir black comedy crime film written and directed by Shane Black (in his directorial debut), and starring Robert Downey Jr., Val Kilmer, Michelle Monaghan, and Corbin Bernsen. The script is partially based on the Brett Halliday novel Bodies Are Where You Find Them (1941), and interprets the classic hardboiled literary genre in a tongue-in-cheek fashion. The film was produced by Joel Silver, with Susan Levin and Steve Richards as executive producers.

Shot in Los Angeles between February 24 and May 3, 2004, the film debuted at the 2005 Cannes Film Festival on May 14, 2005, and was released in the United States on October 21, 2005. It received positive reviews from critics, and grossed $15 million worldwide.

Plot
Harry Lockhart unintentionally wins a screen test in New York City by showing remorse in an audition for a botched burglary he committed, which casting director Dabney Shaw mistakes for method acting. He is sent to Los Angeles for a screen test.

At a party there, Harry meets his childhood crush Harmony Lane and "Gay" Perry van Shrike, a private investigator hired to give him on-the-job tutelage for his screen test. Party host Harlan Dexter, a retired actor, has recently resolved a feud over his wife's inheritance with his estranged daughter, Veronica.

During a stakeout at a Big Bear Lake cabin, Perry and Harry see a car being dumped in the lake. Noticing a female body in the trunk, Perry shoots the lock in a rescue attempt, but accidentally hits the corpse. They decide against reporting it as it will appear he killed her. Believing Harry is a private investigator, Harmony tells him of her sister, Jenna, who supposedly killed herself; he finds the lake corpse, identified as Veronica, in his bathroom and dumps it with Perry, but soon discovers Jenna used Harmony's credit card to hire Perry. Harry goes to see Harmony, who accidentally cuts off his finger when she slams the door, after finding out he lied about being a private investigator.

At a party where Harmony is working, Mr. Frying Pan and Mr. Fire, the two men from the lake, beat Harry to cease his investigation. Harmony and Harry follow them to Perry's latest stakeout: she goes to warn Perry, leaving Harry sleeping in the car, ending in Mr. Frying Pan being killed by an armed food-cart operator. A pink-haired girl, affiliated with Mr. Frying Pan and Mr. Fire, steals Harmony's car and unwittingly drives an unconscious Harry to her home. Mr. Fire arrives and kills her, then Harry kills him.

Harry meets Harmony at his hotel where she reveals she told Jenna that Harlan was her real father, to diminish the pain of their sexually abusive father. She also reveals she slept with Harry's best friend in high school, so he throws her out.

Hearing of Harmony's supposed disappearance, Harry and Perry investigate a mental hospital owned by Harlan. They discover Veronica was locked in there by him, to be replaced by Pink Hair Girl, to end the inheritance feud. Harry unintentionally kills a murderous orderly, and then they are captured by Harlan. Harry contacts Harmony, who steals the van with Veronica's corpse. The men escape, and are shot by the same bullet; Harry then manages to kill Harlan.

In hospital, the trio learn Jenna committed suicide after witnessing Harlan having  sex with Veronica's replacement, believing her "new father" was also incestuous. Perry slaps Jenna's father, who is bed-ridden, as Harry secures a job working for Perry.

Cast

 Robert Downey Jr. as Harold "Harry" Lockhart
 Indio Falconer Downey as Harry age 9
 Richard Alan Brown as Teen Harry (uncredited)
 Val Kilmer as "Gay" Perry van Shrike
 Michelle Monaghan as Harmony Faith Lane
 Ariel Winter as Harmony age 7
 Stephanie Pearson as Teen Harmony
 Corbin Bernsen as Harlan Dexter
 Dash Mihok as Mr. Frying Pan
 Larry Miller as Dabney Shaw
 Rockmond Dunbar as Mr. Fire
 Shannyn Sossamon as Mia Frye (Pink Hair Girl)
 Angela Lindvall as Flicka
 Daniel Browning Smith as Rubber Boy
 Laurence Fishburne as Bear in Genaros Beer Commercial (uncredited)

Production
Following the bad critical reception of The Long Kiss Goodnight and a rejection letter from the Academy of Motion Picture Arts and Sciences, Shane Black decided he would attempt something out of the action genre. Following the example of James L. Brooks, Black attempted to make a romantic comedy, "a quirky story of two kids in L.A." Brooks liked Black's first draft, but felt his later attempts were losing focus. Trying to salvage what he had liked, Brooks suggested Black imagine Jack Nicholson from As Good as It Gets playing Nicholson's role from Chinatown. This led Black to add action elements - "I said, you know, 'Fuck it. I have to put a murder in it.'" - and re-work the screenplay, adding the character of detective "Gay" Perry, who Black said was an attempt to break stereotypes, as he had never seen "the gay guy who kicks down the door, shoots everyone, and bails your ass out before". Old detective novels were a major influence, with Black saying he tried to re-invent the genre "using realistic characters, in a modern setting, but with the spirit of the 1950s and 1960s". The crime plot drew from Brett Halliday's Bodies Are Where You Find Them, and Black homaged Raymond Chandler by splitting the film into chapters named after Chandler's books.

The script, then titled You'll Never Die in This Town Again, was rejected by various studios before Joel Silver, who gave Black his first break producing Lethal Weapon and The Last Boy Scout, decided to help him. The leading role of the now retitled L.A.P.I. had been considered for Benicio del Toro, Hugh Grant and Johnny Knoxville. Robert Downey Jr. learned about the film from his then-girlfriend Susan Levin, who worked as Silver's assistant, and as he finished working with Silver in Gothika, the producer and Black brought him in to audition. Downey was eventually cast as they liked his readings and knew he could fit into the small $15 million budget, as his career had been in a downfall following his time in prison. Levin also suggested bringing in Val Kilmer, who coincidentally had been long interested in making a comedy.

Before principal photography began, the title became Kiss Kiss Bang Bang because Black felt it was a "blunt and austere title" that described how the plot was "half romantic comedy and half murder mystery". To achieve a neo-noir look, Black screened 1960s films of the genre, such as Harper and Point Blank, to cinematographer Michael Barrett and production designer Aaron Osborne. Osborne in particular drew inspiration from the detective book covers by illustrator Robert McGinnis, who was also brought in to draw the covers for the fictional Johnny Gossamer novels that appear in the film. The Hollywood party that opens the film was filmed in Black's own Los Angeles mansion.

Release
Kiss Kiss Bang Bang was screened out of competition at the 2005 Cannes Film Festival. The film premiered at the Chinese Theatre on October 17, 2005 as the opener of the Hollywood Film Festival. Kiss Kiss Bang Bang was released on DVD on June 13, 2006.

Box office
The film opened in limited release on October 21 in the United States. From its release until mid-November, the film's distribution was expanded every weekend due to its favorable critical reviews. It stayed in release in the United States until early January. The film earned a total of $4,243,756 in the United States. Kiss Kiss Bang Bang grossed far more outside the United States, accounting for just over 70% of the film's worldwide gross, accumulating $11,541,392. The film ended up earning $15,785,148 worldwide, earning back its budget. Downey was disappointed at the low box office intake, but said Kiss Kiss Bang Bang "ended up being my calling card to Iron Man", as his performance got the interest of director Jon Favreau. Iron Man would mark Downey's career resurrection, and Black was even brought in to co-write and direct the sequel Iron Man 3.

Critical response
On Rotten Tomatoes, the film has an approval rating of 86%, based on 180 reviews, and an average rating of 7.50/10. The website's critical consensus reads: "Tongue-in-cheek satire blends well with entertaining action and spot-on performances in this dark, eclectic neo-noir homage." On Metacritic, the film has a weighted average score 72 out of 100, based on 37 critic reviews, indicating "generally favorable reviews".

Mike Russell of The Oregonian observed that "This is one of Downey's most enjoyable performances, and one of Kilmer's funniest. It's a relationship comedy wrapped in sharp talk and gunplay, a triumphant comeback for Black, and one of the year's best movies". IGN critic Jeff Otto wrote, "It takes a bunch of genres and twists them into a blender, a pop relic that still feels current ... one of the best times I've had at the movies this year." Kirk Honeycutt of The Hollywood Reporter praised the lead performances, saying "Downey and Monaghan are wonderful at playing characters that compensate for the harshness of their past with flippant swaggers." Todd McCarthy of Variety wrote, "Once again making a diverting but insubstantial movie look better than it is, Downey, with haggard charm to burn, is winning all the way. Kilmer is riotous at times as an impeccably groomed, businesslike guy keen to assert his orientation at every opportunity."

Roger Ebert of the Chicago Sun-Times gave the film two and a half stars out of 4. Ebert opined the film "contains a lot of comedy and invention, but doesn't much benefit from its clever style. The characters and plot are so promising that maybe Black should have backed off and told the story deadpan, instead of mugging so shamelessly for laughs."

In a 2020 interview with Joe Rogan, Robert Downey Jr. described Kiss Kiss Bang Bang as "in some ways the best film I've ever done."

Accolades 
Kiss Kiss Bang Bang was named "Overlooked Film of the Year" by the 2005 Phoenix Film Critics Society. In 2006, Empire magazine named it "Best Thriller".

Soundtrack
The soundtrack to Kiss Kiss Bang Bang with music by John Ottman was released on October 18, 2005.

References

External links

 
 
 

2005 films
2005 black comedy films
2000s buddy comedy films
2000s crime comedy films
2000s comedy mystery films
American films with live action and animation
American black comedy films
American crime comedy films
American buddy comedy films
American comedy mystery films
American detective films
Films scored by John Ottman
Films about actors
Films based on American novels
Films directed by Shane Black
Films produced by Joel Silver
Films set in Indiana
Films set in Los Angeles
Films set in New York City
Films shot in Los Angeles
Incest in film
American neo-noir films
Films with screenplays by Shane Black
Self-reflexive films
Silver Pictures films
Warner Bros. films
Films about Hollywood, Los Angeles
2000s buddy cop films
2000s Christmas comedy films
2005 directorial debut films
2005 comedy films
2000s English-language films
2000s American films